Waltteri Hopponen (born 4 February 1996) is a Finnish ice hockey forward currently playing for Peliitat Heinola of the Finnish Mestis.

References

External links
 

1996 births
Living people
HPK players
Finnish ice hockey forwards
Everett Silvertips players
Sioux City Musketeers players
Lincoln Stars players
Ice hockey people from Helsinki
Ice hockey players at the 2012 Winter Youth Olympics
Youth Olympic gold medalists for Finland